As of April 1, 2016 the garden has closed.

The Botanischer Garten der Universität des Saarlandes (2.5 hectares) is a botanical garden  maintained by Saarland University. It is located on the university campus in Saarbrücken, Saarland, Germany, and is open Monday through Thursday, and Sunday in the warmer months, without charge.

The garden was founded in 1952 and currently contains about 2500 plant species, varieties, and hybrids. It contains greenhouses (1200 m²) as well as a medicinal plant museum of some 2500 accessions representing approximately 1000 taxa that illustrate the basic principles of various healing systems from around the world, including the traditional Indian system (Ayurveda), Chinese medicine, and African and Native American medicine and homeopathy.

See also 
 List of botanical gardens in Germany

External links 
 Botanischer Garten der Universität des Saarlandes
 BGCI entry
 Hermann von Helmholtz-Zentrum entry
 Nabu-Saar article

Botanical gardens in Germany
Gardens in Saarland
Saarland University